The canton of Charente-Vienne is an administrative division of the Charente department, southwestern France. It was created at the French canton reorganisation which came into effect in March 2015. Its seat is in Confolens.

It consists of the following communes:
 
Abzac
Ambernac
Ansac-sur-Vienne
Brigueuil
Brillac
Chabanais
Chabrac
Chassenon
Chirac
Confolens
Épenède
Esse
Étagnac
Exideuil-sur-Vienne
Hiesse
Lessac
Lesterps
Manot
Montrollet
Oradour-Fanais
Pleuville
Pressignac
Saint-Christophe
Saint-Maurice-des-Lions
Saint-Quentin-sur-Charente
Saulgond
Terres-de-Haute-Charente (partly)

References

Cantons of Charente